Beckman is a surname. 

Notable people with the surname include:

Åsa Beckman (born 1961), Swedish literary critic
Arnold Orville Beckman (1900–2004) American chemist
Brad Beckman (1964–1989), American football tight end
Cameron Beckman (born 1970), American professional golfer
Candice Michelle, full name Candice Michelle Beckman-Ehrlich (born 1978), American model, actress, and professional wrestler
Charles Beckman, American tennis player
Charles Beckman (Wisconsin politician), American politician
David Beckman (born 1938), former Canadian Football League head coach
Brig. Gen. Diane Beckman, fictional character in the U.S. TV series Chuck
Ed Beckman (born 1955), former professional American football tight end 
Erik Beckman (1935–1995), Swedish poet, novelist, and playwright
Francis Beckman (1875–1948), former archbishop of Dubuque
Henry Beckman, Canadian stage, film and television actor
John Beckman (1895–1968), American basketball player
Joshua Beckman, American poet
Louis E. Beckman (1876-1946), American politician
Louis E. Beckman Jr. (1914-1992), American politician
Manoel Beckman, 17th century Brazilian rebel
Mary Beckman, professor of Linguistics at Ohio State University
Otto Ludvig Beckman (1856–1909), Swedish Coastal Artillery major general
Raymond Beckman, former American soccer player
Thea Beckman (1923–2004), Dutch author

See also

Beckmann (surname)

Germanic-language surnames
German toponymic surnames